Al son de la marimba is a 1941 Mexican film. It stars Sara García.

External links
 
 Credits

1941 films
Films about percussion and percussionists
1940s Spanish-language films

Mexican black-and-white films
Mexican musical films
1941 musical films
1940s Mexican films